Larry Rubens (born January 25, 1959) is a former American football played who played professionally as a center in the National Football League (NFL) and the United States Football League (USFL). He played college football at Montana State University and was selected to the 1981 1AA Kodak All-American Football Team. He was also inducted into the 2010 Montana State Hall of Fame. After college he played two seasons with the Green Bay Packers in 1982 and 1983. He then played in the USFL for the Memphis Showboats as their starting center and then returned to the NFL with the Chicago Bears in 1986 and 1987.

References

1959 births
Living people
American football centers
Chicago Bears players
Green Bay Packers players
Memphis Showboats players
Montana State Bobcats football players
Players of American football from Spokane, Washington